Klettgau (High Alemannic: Chleggau) is a municipality in the district of Waldshut in Baden-Württemberg, Germany. It is the centre of the Klettgau historical region stretching across the Swiss border into the cantons of Aargau, Schaffhausen and Zürich.

The municipal area includes the villages of Bühl, Erzingen, Geißlingen, Grießen, Rechberg, Riedern am Sand, and Weisweil.

Geography
Klettgau is located on the Klingengraben and Schwarzbach creeks. In the east it borders on the Swiss municipalities of Trasadingen, Wilchingen and Wasterkingen. The neighbouring German municipalities are Wutöschingen, Lauchringen, Küssaberg, and Hohentengen am Hochrhein in the west, as well as Dettighofen in the east. There is a border crossing into Switzerland on the road from Erzingen to Trasadingen.

The municipal area comprises the villages of Bühl, Erzingen, Geißlingen, Grießen, Rechberg, Riedern am Sand, and Weisweil. Erzingen, Bühl and Riedern am Sand are part of the Baden wine region.

History
Erzingen was already mentioned as villa Arcingen in an 876 deed, a Swabian possession held by the Benedictie abbey of Rheinau. In 1486 it was occupied by the forces of the Old Swiss Confederacy on a campaign into the Landgraviate of Klettgau. The immediate landgraviate was inherited by the House of Schwarzenberg in 1687 with their residence in Tiengen, and elevated to a principality by Emperor Leopold I in 1694. After the Schwarzenberg landgraviate was mediatised in 1806, the lordship fell to the Grand Duchy of Baden in 1812.

The present-day municipality was established in a 1971 administrative reform. Bühl and Geißlingen were incorporated in 1975.

Politics
Seats in the municipal assembly (Gemeinderat) as of 2009 local elections:
Christian Democratic Union: 10
Free Voters: 6
Alliance 90/The Greens: 4
Social Democratic Party: 3

Economy

Business
Bucher Hydraulics, founded 1923

Transport

Railway station
Klettgau has a railway station located very close to the border with Switzerland, in Erzingen. The station building was completed in 1863. 

The railway line from Erzingen to Schaffhausen was electrified and tracks along almost the entire route were doubled, allowing for more frequent services to run. The electrification of the line from Erzingen to Waldshut as well as from Waldshut on to Basel Badischer Bahnhof has also been agreed on and is planned.

The station is a border station and as such is in local transport tariff zones in both Germany and Switzerland.

Customs
Erzingen is, for customs purposes, a border station for passengers arriving from Switzerland. Customs checks may be performed in Erzingen station or on board trains by German officials. Systematic passport controls were abolished when Switzerland joined the Schengen Area in 2008.

International relations

Klettgau is twinned with:
 Clisson, France, since 1976
 Sanza, Italy, since 2006

Notable people
Maximilian Stoll (1742–1787), physician
Radbot, Count of Klettgau (c. 985 – 1045)

References

External links
 Municipal website

Waldshut (district)
Baden
Former countries in Europe
Lordships of the Holy Roman Empire
Former monarchies of Europe
Germany–Switzerland border crossings
Former states and territories of Baden-Württemberg